Ajay Raju is an Indian-American attorney who is currently the Chairman and CEO of Raju LLP, a niche law firm. He previously served as the CEO of Dilworth Paxson LLP. and was the managing partner at Reed Smith's Philadelphia office.

Early life
Raju was born in Bhopal, Madhya Pradesh, India where he lived until he was 14 years old. At 14, Raju and his family moved to Northeast Philadelphia. At the time, Raju did not speak English.

In 1988, Raju enrolled at Temple University, which he attended until 1992. After graduation, he attended the Temple University Beasley School of Law, from which he graduated - with honors - in 1996. Originally, Raju planned to become a doctor before deciding to become a lawyer.

Law career
After graduating from law school, Raju took a job with Morgan Lewis & Bockius. During his time there, Raju created a group to deal with logistical issues. In 2004, Raju joined Reed Smith as a partner. There, he mainly focused on commercial real estate, telecommunications law and India. Eventually, he became the managing partner of Reed Smith's Philadelphia office.

Dilworth Paxson
In January 2014, Raju left Reed Smith to become the Co-Chairman and Chief Executive of Dilworth Paxson LLP. It was believed that Dilworth brought Raju in to eventually replace chairman Joseph Jacovini and managing partner Steve Harmelin. He left Dilworth Paxson in 2021. 

An article by The Legal Intelligencer reported that "the profits generated by the high-revenue clients Raju brought in never translated into bigger books of business for their practice, and that some partners were disenchanted with compensation." The Intelligencer reported that Raju was asked to step down as the firm's CEO. Dilworth Paxson Chairman,  Lawrence McMichael said regarding his departure that "Both [Raju] and we felt it would be better for the  firm to be led by a lawyer who is there and actively practicing law and I think [Raju] felt he needed to spend time on his other matters..." Those other ventures include 215 Capital, Pamela and Ajay Raju Foundation and Raju LLC.

Work in Philadelphia
Raju has done a variety of work for the city of Philadelphia. Currently, he serves on the board of the Greater Philadelphia Chamber of Commerce, the World Affairs Council, Philadelphia Museum of Art and Philadelphia Zoo. Raju is also a panelist for ABC 6's Sunday morning show.

Personal life
Raju currently lives in Society Hill, Philadelphia with his 3 kids and his wife, Pamela. Raju is also known for his love of clothes.

In 2017, Raju's office was picketed by a group of activists after he took steps to evict residents, which included many low-income earners and disabled veterans, from an apartment building he invested.

References 

1970 births
Living people
American chief executives
American lawyers
American people of Indian descent
Temple University Beasley School of Law alumni